Ira Edmondson Terrell (born June 19, 1954) is an American retired professional basketball player. Terrell played college basketball for the SMU Mustangs and professionally in the NBA for the Phoenix Suns, New Orleans Jazz, and Portland Trail Blazers.

A 6'8" power forward from Dallas' Roosevelt High School and Southern Methodist University, Terrell played in the National Basketball Association from 1976 to 1979 as a member of the Phoenix Suns, New Orleans Jazz and Portland Trail Blazers. He averaged 7.0 points per game and 4.2 rebounds per game in his career.

Notes 

1954 births
Living people
African-American basketball players
American expatriate basketball people in the Philippines
Basketball players from Dallas
Centers (basketball)
New Orleans Jazz players
Parade High School All-Americans (boys' basketball)
Philippine Basketball Association imports
Phoenix Suns draft picks
Phoenix Suns players
Portland Trail Blazers players
Power forwards (basketball)
SMU Mustangs men's basketball players
U/Tex Wranglers players
American men's basketball players
21st-century African-American people
20th-century African-American sportspeople